RTL II You was an online channel and on-demand feature of the German TV channel RTL II. It was particularly a younger target group to be addressed. The program started on 31 May 2016.] In addition to exclusive productions, anime and US productions were also aired. On RTL II You the news format RTL II News as well as the weather of RTL II were broadcast. RTL II You also worked with some YouTube stars and channels, whose content was also added to the channel.

The channel was accessible via the subdomain you.rtl2.de, where the livestreaming and on-demand offers were available, as well as via an app for devices for Android and iOS. RTL II You was discontinued as of June 30, 2017, as the establishment of the brand fell short of expectations. Formats that run on RTL II You are now to be integrated into the program of RTL II.

Programming

Anime

Digimon Fusion
Dragon Ball
One Piece
Is It Wrong to Try to Pick Up Girls in a Dungeon? (DanMachi)
Pokémon
Sailor Moon
The Devil Is a Part-Timer!
Wish Upon the Pleiades
Yu-Gi-Oh! Zexal

Scripted Reality

Berlin – Tag & Nacht
Köln 50667
Next, Please!
X-Diaries

References

External links
 

2016 establishments in Germany
2017 disestablishments in Germany
RTL Group
Mass media in Munich